Ugarchin Point (‘Nos Ugarchin’ \'nos u-g&r-'chin\) is a point on the northeast coast of Robert Island in the South Shetland Islands, Antarctica projecting 300 m into Nelson Strait.  Named after the town of Ugarchin in northern Bulgaria.

Location

Maps
 L.L. Ivanov. Antarctica: Livingston Island and Greenwich, Robert, Snow and Smith Islands. Scale 1:120000 topographic map. Troyan: Manfred Wörner Foundation, 2010.  (First edition 2009. )
 Antarctic Digital Database (ADD). Scale 1:250000 topographic map of Antarctica. Scientific Committee on Antarctic Research (SCAR). Since 1993, regularly updated.

References
 Ugarchin Point. SCAR Composite Antarctic Gazetteer
 Bulgarian Antarctic Gazetteer. Antarctic Place-names Commission. (details in Bulgarian, basic data in English)

External links
 Ugarchin Point. Copernix satellite image

Headlands of Robert Island
Bulgaria and the Antarctic